Sulehri Kashif Ali (born 6 April 1986) is a Pakistani badminton player.

Achievements

South Asian Games 
Men's doubles

BWF International Challenge/Series 
Men's doubles

  BWF International Challenge tournament
  BWF International Series tournament
  BWF Future Series tournament

References

External links 
 

Living people
1986 births
Pakistani male badminton players
Badminton players at the 2018 Asian Games
Asian Games competitors for Pakistan
South Asian Games bronze medalists for Pakistan
South Asian Games medalists in badminton